Rickenbacker Air National Guard Base is an Ohio Air National Guard installation located near Lockbourne in southern Franklin County.  The base was named for the famous early aviator and Columbus native Eddie Rickenbacker. It is the home of the United States Air Force's 121st Air Refueling Wing (121 ARW), which serves as the host wing and is an Air National Guard (ANG) unit operationally-gained by the Air Mobility Command (AMC).

Rickenbacker ANGB is part of a joint airfield operation as a tenant activity of the Columbus Regional Airport Authority in a joint civil-military airfield arrangement with commercial airlines and other civilian aircraft operators utilizing the colocated Rickenbacker International Airport.  Rickenbacker ANGB is also a joint military facility, with tenant activities of the Ohio Army National Guard (Army Aviation Support Facility #2), as well as Navy Reserve and Marine Corps Reserve units and associated facilities.

During World War II, the installation was a U.S. Army Air Forces training base known as Lockbourne Army Airfield, becoming an air force base in 1948 a few months following the establishment of the United States Air Force as an independent branch of the U.S. armed forces.  The base was named Lockbourne AFB from 1948 to 1974 and later Rickenbacker AFB from 1974 to 1980.   The facility was transferred from Strategic Air Command and the active duty Air Force on 1 April 1980 and turned over to the Air National Guard.

Further reading

 

 Maurer, Maurer. Air Force Combat Units of World War II. Washington, DC: U.S. Government Printing Office 1961 (republished 1983, Office of Air Force History).
 Ravenstein, Charles A. Air Force Combat Wings Lineage and Honors Histories 1947–1977. Maxwell Air Force Base, Alabama: Office of Air Force History 1984. .
 Mueller, Robert, Air Force Bases Volume I, Active Air Force Bases Within the United States of America on 17 September 1982, Office of Air Force History, 1989
 Futrell, Robert Frank (1983) The United States Air Force in Korea, 1950–1953, Maxwell AFB, Alabama Office of Air Force History, 
 Lloyd, Alwyn T. (2000), A Cold War Legacy, A Tribute to Strategic Air Command, 1946–1992, Pictorial Histories Publications 
 Rogers, Brian (2005). United States Air Force Unit Designations Since 1978. Hinkley, England: Midland Publications. .
 Turner Publishing Company (1997), Strategic Air Command: The Story of the Strategic Air Command and Its People. Turner Publishing Company 
 Manning, Thomas A. (2005), History of Air Education and Training Command, 1942–2002.  Office of History and Research, Headquarters, AETC, Randolph AFB, Texas 
 Shaw, Frederick J. (2004), Locating Air Force Base Sites, History’s Legacy, Air Force History and Museums Program, United States Air Force, Washington DC. 
 USAAS-USAAC-USAAF-USAF Aircraft Serial Numbers – 1908 to present
 ArmyAirForces.com
 Strategic-Air-Command.com
 American Military Aircraft (RB-29, RB-45, EB-47, RB-47)
 Air Force Historical Research Agency
 Rickenbacker International Airport Official Website(Source of much of early history and information about turnover to civil authorities)

Installations of the United States Air Force in Ohio
Installations of the United States Air National Guard
Buildings and structures in Franklin County, Ohio
Superfund sites in Ohio
Military Superfund sites
1980 establishments in Ohio
Military installations established in 1980